Khabane "Khaby" Lame (born 9 March 2000) is a Senegalese-born Italian social media personality. He is known for his TikTok videos in which he silently mocks overly complicated "life hack" videos. As of February  , Lame is the most-followed user on TikTok.

Early life 

Lame was born in Senegal on 9 March 2000. His family moved to a public housing complex in Chivasso, Italy, when he was one year old. He has three siblings. He studied in Italian schools until he was fourteen, when his parents decided to temporarily send him to study in a Quranic school near Dakar. Lame worked as a CNC machine operator at a factory near Turin, before getting laid off in March 2020.

Career 

After he was laid off during the COVID-19 pandemic, Lame began posting on TikTok. His early videos showed him dancing and watching video games. He rose to popularity with his video responses in the form of TikTok's "duet" and "stitch" features to videos depicting complicated "life hacks", in which he performs the same task in a simple way, without saying anything, followed by a trademark hand gesture. In April 2021, he surpassed Gianluca Vacchi as the most-followed Italian on TikTok; surpassed Addison Rae to become the second most-followed personality overall by April 2021. In August 2021, Lame appeared as a co-star for Juventus F.C.'s announcement of Manuel Locatelli. In September 2021, he attended the Venice Film Festival as a special guest for the first screening of French film Lost Illusions by Xavier Giannoli. In January 2022, Lame signed a multi-year partnership with Hugo Boss and was featured in the #BeYourOwnBoss campaign.

On 22 June 2022, Lame became TikTok's most-followed creator, surpassing Charli D'Amelio with 142.1 million followers.

Lame was appointed as a juror on the television show Italia's Got Talent in 2023.

Public image 

Taylor Lorenz and Jason Horowitz of The New York Times attributed Lame's success to his "universal exasperated everyman quality" and described his rise to fame as different from most TikTok stars in being "entirely organic". Samir Chaudry, the founder of The Publish Press, a newsletter focused on the creator economy, stated that Lame's appeal derived from his emphasizing "authenticity over production" and "not trying too hard". Christina Ferraz, the founder of American marketing agency Thirty6Five, stated, "His exasperation is relatable, and feelings are universal." Lame has credited his popularity to his humorous facial expressions and his silence, which he has described as "a way to reach as many people as possible". As of January , 6 of the 25 most-liked videos on TikTok are his.

Personal life 

Khaby Lame is a practicing Muslim. Lame announced his engagement to Zaira Nucci in October 2020.

Lame has lived in Italy since he was one year old and is fluent in Italian. He was a Senegalese citizen living in Milan with his agent until August 2022, when he became an Italian citizen in Chivasso after the Italian Undersecretary of the Ministry of the Interior Carlo Sibilia announced that he would be granted citizenship. Lame said he "always felt Italian", and has previously stated that he "did not need a piece of paper" to define himself as such.

Filmography 
Lame has a voice cameo in the Italian-dubbed version of Black Panther: Wakanda Forever (2022).

Bibliography

See also 

 List of most-followed TikTok accounts
 List of most-liked TikTok videos
 List of most-followed Instagram accounts

References

External links 

 
 
 
 

2000 births
Senegalese TikTokers
Living people
Senegalese Muslims
Italian Muslims
People from Chivasso
Muslim comedians
Senegalese emigrants to Italy
Italian male comedians
Senegalese comedians